Martin Herdman (born 24 July 1956) is an English actor, boxer and former professional rugby league footballer.

Rugby league career
Herdman played at representative level for Wales, and club level for Fulham RLFC. He played as a  during the era of contested scrums. He won three caps for Wales while at Fulham from 1981 to 1982.

In 1984, Herdman went to America after being given a tryout as a running back for the Kansas City Chiefs, but was cut from their roster.

Acting career
Herdman has played regular parts in Bramwell, Coronation Street, Family Affairs, Soldier Soldier, Drop the Dead Donkey, Silent Witness, Wycliffe, The Bill and Midsomer Murders. He played the lead role in the 2018 feature film Sink., written and directed by Mark Gillis.

Personal life
Herdman is the father of four sons, the youngest of whom is actor Joshua Herdman of the Harry Potter films. He runs the Herdman Family Carpet Shop in St Margarets.

References

External links
 
 Biography at martinherdman.com
 

1956 births
Living people
English male boxers
English male film actors
English male television actors
Leigh Leopards players
London Broncos players
Rugby league second-rows
Sportspeople from Chertsey
Wales national rugby league team players